Georg Hellat (3 March 1870, Puka, Governorate of Livonia – 28 August 1943, Tallinn, Generalbezirk Estland) was an Estonian architect.

His most known masterpiece is the building of the Estonian Students' Society in Tartu (1902).

References

1870 births
1943 deaths
People from Otepää Parish
People from Kreis Dorpat
Estonian architects
Modernist architects